Marinici is a commune in Nisporeni District, Moldova. It is composed of two villages, Heleșteni and Marinici.

References

Communes of Nisporeni District